"The Hungry Fire of Love'" is a single by Canadian country music artist Carroll Baker. Released in 1975, it was the second single from her album Carroll Baker. The song reached number one on the RPM Country Tracks chart in Canada in August 1975.

Chart performance

References

1975 singles
Carroll Baker songs
1975 songs
RCA Records singles